Quba Mêrê Dîwanê is the world's largest Yazidi temple. It is located in the Armenian village of Aknalich, in the province of Armavir, where the Yezidis are the largest minority. The village of Aknalich is located 35 kilometers west of Yerevan, the capital of Armenia.

The temple was opened in September 2019 and the opening ceremony was attended by the Deputy Prime Minister of Armenia and other Armenian officials.

The temple is 25 metres high and consists of seven domes surrounding a central, arched roof, and houses a seminary and museum. The temple is dedicated to the angel Melek Taus and the Seven Angels of Yazidi theology. The highest dome and the other seven surrounding ones symbolize the angels and are adorned with golden suns. The design is heavily inspired by Lalish in northern Iraq, the holiest temple of the Yazidis and a site of pilgrimage. Adjacent to the temple is a Yazidi cemetery. In a statue park opposite the temple are a statue of Nobel Prize winner Nadia Murad, a statue honouring Andranik Ozanian, an Armenian military commander who fought the Ottomans in the late 1880s, and an Armenian apostolic cross intertwined with the Yazidi sun, signifying religious harmony.

Funded by an Armenian Yazidi living in Russia, Mirza Sloian, Quba Mêrê Dîwanê was built just a few meters away from Ziarat, Armenia's first Yazidi temple established in 2012. The temple is designed by Artak Ghulyan, one of Armenia's most prolific architects of religious buildings.

Yazidis are one of the largest ethnic minorities in Armenia, practicing an ancient, monotheistic belief that has similarities to Christianity, Hinduism, Judaism, Sufism, and Zoroastrianism along with elements of sun worship.

According to the Armenian census, 35,000 Yazidis lived in Armenia in 2011, mostly in the western and northern regions of the southern Caucasus.

See also
Yazidis in Armenia
List of Yazidi holy places
Sultan Ezid Temple

References

Yazidi holy places
Buildings and structures in Armavir Province
Kurdish words and phrases